Basil Hallam (3 April 1888 – 20 August 1916), born Basil Hallam Radford, was an early 20th century English actor and singer, known for the character of Gilbert the Filbert in The Passing Show. He died in action on the Western Front during World War I.

Early life
Hallam was born on 3 April 1888 at 55 Marine Parade, Brighton, East Sussex, England, the youngest son and child of Walter Thomas Hindmarsh Radford, a ship and insurance broker, (1845–1927) and Ann Louisa Maria Radford (née Wulff) (1847–1924). He was the youngest of six siblings: Annie Marguerite (1874–1943), Walter Guy (1875–1947), Ethel May (1880–?), Archibald Campbell (1881–1958) and Maurice Clive (1884–1915). He was baptised on 23 May 1888 in St Mary's, Hendon, Middlesex. He was educated at the Meads preparatory school in Eastbourne, Charterhouse School and the University of Oxford.

Theatrical career
He began his career in Shakespearean roles with Sir Herbert Beerbohm Tree's company in 1908. He had an early success as Archie Graham in Cosmo Hamilton's The Blindness of Virtue, opposite Doris Lytton as Effie.  He appeared in New York City with Billie Burke in Mrs. Dot. On 2 April 1911 he was resident at 25 Park Crescent, St Marylebone, London, England.

He created the character of a privileged young "knut", Gilbert the Filbert, for The Passing Show (1914), the original revue of that title by Herman Finck, which opened at the Palace Theatre, London, on 20 April 1914. He also recorded the song of the same name for the HMV label on 4 June 1914. (The song can be heard on a 2012 release by the Diversions record label, The Finck Album, sung by Mart Sander).

Personal life
Before entering service for World War I Hallam fell in love with Elsie Janis, with whom he had starred in The Passing Show of 1915. They set up home in the city of Liverpool.

Death
Hallam died aged 28 whilst serving as a Captain with a Kite Balloon Section of the Royal Flying Corps in France at the Battle of the Somme. In the afternoon of 20 August 1916 on the Northern part of the Somme battlefield he was crewing a tethered un-powered observation balloon watching the German line near the village of Gommecourt, when its steel cable tether snapped, and the balloon, caught in an Easterly wind, began to drift towards enemy lines out of control. To avoid capture, Hallam bailed out of the balloon's basket but he was obstructed from jumping clear, and fell several hundred feet to his death after his emergency parachute failed to deploy. His body was buried at a British military cemetery at the nearby village of Couin.

References

External links

Photos of Hallam

1889 births
1916 deaths
British military personnel killed in the Battle of the Somme
English male stage actors
19th-century British male singers
20th-century English male actors
Alumni of the University of Oxford
People educated at Charterhouse School
Parachuting deaths
20th-century British male singers
British Army personnel of World War I
Royal Flying Corps officers
Military personnel from Sussex